Hippocephala dimorpha is a species of beetle in the family Cerambycidae. It was described by Gressitt in 1937.

References

Agapanthiini
Beetles described in 1937
Taxa named by Judson Linsley Gressitt